Serug ( – Śərūḡ, "branch";  – Seroúkh) was the son of Reu and the father of Nahor, according to Genesis 11:20–23. He is also the great-grandfather of Abraham, thus the ancestor of the Ishmaelites and the Israelites.

In scriptures 
In the Masoretic text on which modern Bibles are based, he was 30 years old when Nahor was born, and he lived for another 200 years, making his age at death 230 (when Abraham was either 41 or 101). However, the Septuagint (LXX) and Samaritan Pentateuch texts state that he was 130 on fathering Nahor; the Samaritan Pentateuch gives his age at death as 230, stating that he lived another 100 years, while the LXX has 200, making him 330 at his death.

Further details are provided in the Book of Jubilees, which gives the names of his mother, Ora (11:1), and wife, Milcah (11:6). It also states that his original name was Seroh, but that it was changed to Serug in the time when Noah's children began to fight wars, and the city of Ur Kesdim was built, where Serug lived. It says this Serug was the first of the patriarchal line to abandon monotheism and turn to idol worship, teaching sorcery to his son Nahor.

In popular culture 
The biblical film Abraham (1993) uses Serug's name for a younger member of Abraham's caravan. The character's younger version is played by Aziz Khaldoun and the adult version is played by Tom Radcliffe.

References

Book of Genesis people
Ur of the Chaldees
Book of Jubilees